George Fall was a member of the Los Angeles, California, Common Council, the governing body of that city, in 1870–71 and was also a part of a mob that lynched anywhere from 18 to 84 Chinese in the Chinese massacre of 1871.

During a coroner's inquest that followed the riot on October 24, 1871, Fall was identified as having attacked an influential Chinese leader, Yo Hing, with a plank of wood.

References

Year of birth missing
Year of death missing
Los Angeles City Council members